Maria Marconi (born 28 August 1984) is a diver from Italy, who represented her native country at the 2000 Summer Olympics. She won the qualification tournament for the 2008 Summer Olympics, also twice won a bronze medal at the European Championships (2002 and 2006) and once a silver medal (2009). She was 6th in the 1 meter springboard event at the 2009 FINA World Championships.

She is a sister of divers Nicola Marconi and Tommaso Marconi.

References
 Profile

Italian female divers
1984 births
Living people
Divers at the 2000 Summer Olympics
Divers at the 2008 Summer Olympics
Divers at the 2016 Summer Olympics
Olympic divers of Italy
Divers from Rome